Bray House may refer to:

Australia
Bray House, in Hutt Street, Adelaide, South Australia

United States

Bray-Barron House, Eufaula, AL, listed on the NRHP in Alabama
Bray-Valenzuela House, Tucson, AZ, listed on the NRHP in Arizona
Bray Place, Louisville, KY, listed on the NRHP in Kentucky
Bray House (Kittery Point, Maine), listed on the NRHP in Maine
Taylor-Bray Farm, Yarmouth, MA, listed on the NRHP in Massachusetts
Thomas Bray Farm, Yarmouth, MA, listed on the NRHP in Massachusetts
Bray-Hoffman House, Annandale, NJ, listed on the NRHP in New Jersey
Cadmus N. Bray House, Siler City, NC, listed on the NRHP in North Carolina